Govind Chandra Munda is a politician from Odisha, India. He represented Keonjhar (Lok Sabha constituency) during the 9th and 10th Lok Sabha. He represented as a Janata Dal candidate.

References

Lok Sabha members from Odisha
People from Kendujhar district
Janata Dal politicians
India MPs 1977–1979
India MPs 1989–1991
India MPs 1991–1996